St. Anton Pass (el. 1110 m.) is a high mountain pass in the Alps between the cantons of Appenzell Innerrhoden and St. Gallen in Switzerland.

It connects Ruppen Pass (St. Gall) and Oberegg (Appenzell Inner Rhodes).

See also 

 List of highest paved roads in Europe
 List of mountain passes
 List of the highest Swiss passes

References

Anton
Anton
Mountain passes of Appenzell Innerrhoden
Mountain passes of the canton of St. Gallen